Babepur is a village located in Jhajjar district in the Indian state of Haryana.

Demographics
In 2011, Babepur village has population of 1014 of which 514 are males while 500 are females.

Religion
Majority of the residents are Hindu, with Jats being the dominant social group.

See also 
 Sarola
 Subana
 Khudan
 Chhapar, Jhajjar
 Dhakla, Jhajjar

References 

Villages in Jhajjar district